Odesa National Academy of Food Technologies (ONAFT) is a public HEI with the highest level of accreditation. It was established in 1902 and today is a modern innovative scientific center for training of high qualified personnel. ONAFT is a multi-profile HEI which includes 4 scientific-educational institutions, 11 faculties and research institute with 15 scientific schools. ONAFT has about 6500 students in 21 areas of training, 42 training programs, 10 doctorate and 3 post-doctorate programs, 4 specialized scientific councils for doctorate and post-doctorate theses defense. Educational and research activities of ONAFT provides 104 doctors/professors and 388 PhD/associate professors. ONAFT cooperates with 50 HEIs from more than 20 countries worldwide, as well as with numerous national and international companies in scientific and training fields. It is a member of international associations: European Universities Association, Eurasian Association of Universities, Black Sea Universities Network, International Council for Open and Distance Education, The Magna Charta Observatory etc.

By order of the Ministry of Education and Science of Ukraine No.918 of August 18, 2021, the Odesa National Academy of Food Technologies was reorganized into the Odesa National Technological University.

Ministry of Justice of Ukraine: Certificate of state registration of the print media series KB No.14344-3315P dated 04.08.2008

The founders of the publication are the Institute of Market Problems and Economic and Environmental Research of the National Academy of Sciences of Ukraine and Odesa National Technological University.

Food technology organizations
Educational institutions established in 1902
Technical universities and colleges in Ukraine
Education in Odesa
Food science institutes
National universities in Ukraine
1902 establishments in the Russian Empire
Research institutes in the Soviet Union